Prairie Profile is a Canadian documentary television series which aired on CBC Television in 1965.

Premise
Historic and biographical films about Manitoba and Saskatchewan were featured during this series.

Scheduling
This half-hour series was broadcast on Sundays at 1:00 p.m. (Eastern) from 3 January to 11 April 1965.

References

External links
 

CBC Television original programming
1965 Canadian television series debuts
1965 Canadian television series endings